Vladimir Anatolyevich Matorin (May 2, 1948) is a famous Russian opera singer. He is considered one of the greatest contemporary bass singer in Russia.

Biography
Vladimir was born May 2, 1948, in Moscow, Russia. After graduation from Gnessin music academy he became a part of the Stanislavsky and Nemirovich-Danchenko Moscow Academic Music Theatre in 1974. In 1991 he was invited to Bolshoi Theatre troupe. He performed the major arias in such operas as Boris Godunov, Khovanshchina, Aleko and others.

Honours and awards
 Order of Merit for the Fatherland;
3rd class (29 April 29, 2008) - for outstanding contribution to the development of national music and many years of creative activity
4th class (22 March 2001) - for outstanding contribution to the development of national music and theatre
 People's Artist of Russia (1997)
 International Competition for musicians in Geneva, II Prize (1973)
 All-Union competition of vocalists named after M. Glinka, II Prize (1977)

External links
 Rayfield Allied Profile

Bibliography
Russian Musical Newspaper Культура №10 (7623) 13-19 марта 2008 г. Владимир Маторин: «Я для вас — способ быть добрее»

1948 births
Russian opera singers
Operatic basses
Living people
Recipients of the Order "For Merit to the Fatherland", 3rd class
Glinka State Prize of the RSFSR winners
People's Artists of Russia